The Dragon King or Dragon Kings (also Dragon Gods(s)), are deities in Chinese tradition (Taoism). 

Dragon King(s) in Hinduism and Buddhism refer to the Nagarajas. The Dragon King in Japanese tradition is Ryū-ō aka Ryūjin ("Dragon god") of Ryūgū-jō, sometimes equated with the sea-god Watatsumi.

Dragon King may also refer to:

Arts and entertainment
 Dragon King (DC Comics)
 Dragon King, an enemy of comics superheroine Spider-Girl
 Dragon Kings, fictional characters in Exalted
 Dark Kingdom: The Dragon King, a 2004 German television film 
 Dragon Kings (Dark Sun), an accessory for Dungeons & Dragons
 Onaga or the Dragon King, a Mortal Kombat character
 The Dragon King (adventure book), by Trevor Baxendale, 2008
 The Dragon King (novel), by R. A. Salvatore, 1996
 Dragon king, a playing piece in Shogi
 Ryūō ('Dragon King'), an annual Japanese professional shogi tournament and the title of its winner

Other uses
 Druk Gyalpo ('Dragon King'), the head of state of the Kingdom of Bhutan
 Dragon king theory, a statistical metaphor
 Operation Dragon King, a 1978 military operation in northern Arakan, Burma

See also
 Dragon (disambiguation)
 Ryūō (disambiguation)
 Japanese dragon
 List of water deities